Lobelia brevifolia, the shortleaf lobelia, is a flowering plant species in the genus Lobelia. It is a perennial dicot in the Campanulaceae (bellflower) family. It grows in the Southeastern United States, in parts of Florida, Alabama, Mississippi, and Louisiana.

In Florida it grows in the Florida panhandle.

References

brevifolia
Flora of Florida
Flora of Alabama
Flora of Mississippi
Flora of Louisiana